Francisco Sánchez Martínez (5 August 1967 – 13 February 2022) was a Colombian long-distance runner who specialized in mountain running. He won the bronze medal at the 1991 World Mountain Running Trophy and won the Sierre-Zinal the same year.

Biography
Born in Bogotá, Sánchez practiced football and cycling in his youth. Due to his lack of professional skill in the sports, he took up running at the age of 20. He emerged as an elite runner in 1991, winning the Colombian Mountain Running Championship organized by Jairo Correa. The Colombian Athletics Federation sent him to Switzerland to take part in the Sierre-Zinal the same year, in which he emerged victorious and set a new course record. At the World Mountain Running Trophy in 1991, he led for much of the race, but was overtaken by  late and eventually finished third.

In 1992, Sánchez again attempted to break the record at the Sierre-Zinal and started strong, but faltered in the second half of the race and finished 26th. He retired from the World Championships and instead finished seventh in the Jungfrau Marathon.

Sánchez was nicknamed the "trucha" (trout) from a young age because his mother said he could not stand still as a child. He died on 13 February 2022, at the age of 54. According to his family, he had just received his third dose of the COVID-19 vaccine.

References

1967 births
2022 deaths
Colombian male long-distance runners
Colombian mountain runners
Sportspeople from Bogotá